The 2011–12 Petron Blaze Boosters season was the 37th season of the franchise in the Philippine Basketball Association (PBA).

Key dates
August 28: The 2011 PBA Draft took place in Robinson's Place Ermita, Manila.

Draft picks

Roster

Philippine Cup

Eliminations

Standings

Bracket

Quarterfinals

Petron Blaze-Meralco series

Semifinals

Talk 'N Text-Petron Blaze series

Commissioner's Cup

Eliminations

Standings

Governors' Cup

Eliminations

Standings

Transactions

Trades

Pre-season

Commissioner's Cup

Additions

Subtractions

Recruited imports

References

San Miguel Beermen seasons
Petron